Arthur Pershing "Tarzan" White (December 6, 1915 – January 23, 1996) was an American football offensive lineman in the National Football League for the New York Giants and Chicago Cardinals.  

White's football career began at Atmore High School, where he was named an all-state player in 1929. He played college football at the University of Alabama, where he was All-American in 1936. While at Alabama, he was a member of Phi Beta Kappa and earned both a bachelor's and a master's degree in mathematics.

White was drafted by the New York Giants in the second round of the 1937 NFL Draft. He was a Pro Bowl player in 1938. He played two seasons with the Chicago Cardinals from 1940 to 1941.

When the United States entered the Second World War, White joined the Army Air Corps. He continued to play football for the Army all-star team and attained the rank of lieutenant. After the war, he returned to civilian athletics as a professional wrestler. As a wrestler, he would win multiple world heavyweight championships.

Art White was inducted into the Alabama Sports Hall of Fame in 1981.

References

1915 births
1996 deaths
People from Covington County, Alabama
Players of American football from Alabama
Alabama Crimson Tide football players
American football guards
Chicago Cardinals players
New York Giants players